Naviculaceae is a diatom family in the order Naviculales.

Naviculaceae are typically composed of lineate areolae, one of the many forms of areolae. Some of the other areolae are punctate (Gomphoneis) and loculate (Diploneis). These can be found among other families of diatoms including Thalassiosiraceae.  The areolae found in Naviculaceae tend to be uniseriate. Some Naviculaceae tend to have a pseudoseptum which is a silica plate extending internally from the apical portion of the valve. To contrast, a pseudoseptum is part of a valve while a septum is part of a copula, or girdle band. For example, the pseudoseptum occurs in some species of Gomphonema, Gomphoneis, Stauroneis and Navicula. The plural is pseudosepta.

Genera

 Adlafia
 Alveovallum
 Amicula
 Astartiella
 Austariella
 Berkella
 Caloneis
 Capartogramma
 Chamaepinnularia
 Cocconema
 Craspedostauros
 Cymatoneis
 Decussata
 Diademoides
 Envekadea
 Eolimna
 Fistulifera
 Geissleria
 Germainiella
 Haslea
 Hippodonta
 Kobayasiella
 Krasskella
 Kurpiszia
 Lacunicula
 Lecohuia
 Lulicola
 Mastoneis
 Mayamaea
 Melonavicula
 Membraneis
 Meuniera
 Microcostatus
 Microfissurata
 Muelleria
 Navicula
 Naviculadicta
 Navigiolum
 Neidiopsis
 Nupela
 Pinnunavis
 Plagiotropus
 Prestauroneis
 Pseudogomphonema
 Pseudonavicula
 Pulchella
 Rhoikoneis
 Seminavis
 Stauroptera
 Trachyneis
 Veigaludwigia

References

Naviculales
Diatom families
Taxa named by Friedrich Traugott Kützing